The Old English Latin alphabet generally consisted of about 24 letters, and was used for writing Old English from the 8th to the 12th centuries. Of these letters, most were directly adopted from the Latin alphabet, two were modified Latin letters (Æ, Ð), and two developed from the runic alphabet (Ƿ, Þ). The letters Q and Z were essentially left unused outside of foreign names, while the letter K was used by some writers but not by others. The Middle English manuscripts Stowe MS 57 and Cotton Titus D 18 do not present the letters in the exact same order, but both place the non-standard Latin letters at the end of the alphabet.
 

Old English was first written in runes (futhorc) but shifted to a (minuscule) half-uncial script of the Latin alphabet introduced by Irish Christian missionaries from around the 8th century. This was replaced by Insular script, a cursive and pointed version of the half-uncial script. This was used until the end of the 12th century when continental Carolingian minuscule (also known as Caroline) replaced the insular, along with a shift in spelling conventions toward the Old French alphabet, leading to Middle English.

The letter ðæt  (called eth or edh in modern English) was an alteration of Latin , and the runic letters thorn  and wynn  are borrowings from futhorc. Also used was a symbol for the conjunction and, a character similar to the number seven (called a Tironian et or ond), and a symbol for the relative pronoun þæt, a thorn with a crossbar through the ascender. Macrons  over vowels were rarely used to indicate long vowels, but it was also used occasionally as a nasal indicator (sort of like a tilde) if the vowel was succeeded by an s (ms or ns would turn into ◌̄s).

References

Bibliography 
 J. Bosworth & T. Northcote Toller, An Anglo-Saxon Dictionary, Clarendon Press, Oxford, 1898

External links 

Latin alphabets
Alphabet